The Elephant Table Album: a compilation of difficult music was a 1983 compilation album, released on Xtract Records. The double album was compiled by music journalist Dave Henderson following a series of articles by him in Sounds, the British music paper. It was reissued on CD by the same label in 1989, but with the tracks sourced from the vinyl release rather than the master tape, and the number of tracks reduced from 21 to 17. The tracks consisted of a selection by lesser-known experimental, industrial and electronic artists of the period.

Track listing 

Side 1

 Portion Control - Chew You To Bits
 Chris and Cosey - Raining Tears Of Blood
 Metamorphosis - Musak From Hawthorne Court
 Coil - S Is For Sleep
 Nurse With Wound - Nana Or A Thing Of Uncertain Nonsense
 
Side 2

 400 Blows - Beat The Devil
 Konstruktivits - Andropov '84
 Lustmord - The Boning Of Men
 Muslimgauze - Milena Jelenska
 David Jackman - Edge of Nothing

Side 3

 SPK - Despair
 MFH - Vox Humana
 Nocturnal Emissions - Suffering Stinks
 Attrition - Dream Sleep
 Legendary Pink Dots - Surprise, Surprise
 Paul Kelday - Birth of Planetesimals

Side 4

 Bourbonese Qualk - Under The City
 Sirius B - Build Your Children
 New 7th Music - New Human Switchbaord (Extract)
 We Be Echo - Alleycat
 Bushido - Modelwerk

Release details
 Catalogue number: Xx001
 Format: Double Vinyl LP (5 September 1983), single CD (1989)
The CD version lacks the tracks by Paul Kelday, We Be Echo, New 7th Music and Muslimgauze.

Influence
Steven Stapleton of Nurse with Wound also did the artwork for the album, and was sufficiently impressed by David Jackman's track that he invited him to collaborate on a series of music projects.

The album has been cited as an influence on the EBM genre.

Despite the "difficult" nature of the music, one band on the album, 400 Blows, hit the British charts in 1985 with "Movin'", a cover version of a Brass Construction song.

Three Minute Symphony
A second album, Three Minute Symphony (XTract XX002), was released in 1984; again it was a double LP compiled by Dave Henderson. Each artist was invited to provide a track of approximately three minutes' duration. In contrast to The Elephant Table Album's emphasis on British-based music, many of the featured artists were from other countries, including the USA, France, Belgium, Germany, Italy and Japan.

Side 1
 Kill Ugly Pop Let's Get Real Gone
 Ptôse - Waiting For My Soul
 Trax - Trax Co Mix 1
 Die Tödliche Doris - Maria
 Van Kaye And Ignit - A Slice Of The Action
 Bene Gesserit - White Men

Side 2
 Colin Potter - The State
 Human Flesh - L'Ultima Storia
 DDAA - Your Mother With A Cake
 Point of Collapse - When Worlds Collide
 David Jackman - Wolf
 Sema - Untitled

Side 3
 Hunting Lodge - Tribal Warning Shot (instrumental)
 Roll Kommando - Die Romantik Ist Tot
 Stratis - I Fotia
 Merzbow - Xa-Bungle
 Philip Johnson - Always Behind You
 Conrad Schnitzler - Three Minute Symphony No 1

Side 4
 Magamatzu - Bird, Spider, Fly
 Hurt - Money Matters
 Nurse With Wound - Antacid Cocamotive 93
 Legendary Pink Dots - No Bell, No Prize
 Asmus Tietchens - Dahinter Industriegelande
 Smegma - The Breathing Method

References

2x12" vinyl LP at discogs.com
CD entry at discogs.com

External links
The text of Dave Henderson's original article

1983 compilation albums
Experimental rock compilation albums
Industrial compilation albums
Electronic compilation albums
Cassette culture 1970s–1990s